De Niña a Mujer (English: From a Child to a Woman) is a 1981 album by Julio Iglesias. The album was his first Spanish-language album to be released in the United States by Columbia Records to capitalize on the singer's rising popularity. The American version was retitled "From a Child to a Woman" and released simultaneously with the original Discos CBS version. The album, as its title implies, was dedicated to his daughter Chabeli, who is featured on the album's cover alongside her dad.

Track listing
All tracks produced by Ramón Arcusa.

Charts

Weekly charts

Year-end charts

Certifications and sales

See also 
 List of best-selling albums in Brazil

References

1981 albums
Julio Iglesias albums
Spanish-language albums
Columbia Records albums